The Ollie Deneyschen Tunnel, usually called the Daspoort Tunnel is a road tunnel in Pretoria, South Africa. It connects the suburbs of Claremont and Danville. It was constructed after Pretoria City Councillor A.P. Deneyschen noticed that Iscor workers living in Hercules were forced to travel a long distance to work. Construction of the tunnel took 40 months, and cost R1.7 million. It was opened on 10 August 1972 by Mayor of Pretoria GJ Malherbe. It has a length of 573 m, width of 11.6 m, a height of 7.5 m in the middle and 13.6 m at the ends, and has a capacity of 6000 vehicles a day. The tunnel lies on the R55 regional route.

References

Tunnels in South Africa
Buildings and structures in Pretoria
Tunnels completed in 1972
Road tunnels in Africa